The Mercedes-Benz M23 engine is a naturally-aspirated, 1.5-liter, inline-4 gasoline engine, designed, developed and produced by Mercedes-Benz; between 1934 and 1939.

Applications
Mercedes-Benz 150 (W30)

References

Mercedes-Benz engines
Straight-four engines
Engines by model
Gasoline engines by model